Christine May (born 23 March 1948, in Dublin) is a Scottish Labour Co-operative politician. She was the Member of the Scottish Parliament (MSP) for Central Fife constituency from 2003 to 2007. 

Raised and educated in Dublin, Christine worked in the catering industry in Dublin and then London, and first moved to Scotland in 1984, where she became a college lecturer.

She was elected to the Central Fife seat after former First Minister Henry McLeish stood down as MSP following a scandal relating to the sub-letting of his constituency office – dubbed "Officegate" by the media. She had previously been leader of Fife Council from 1998. She represented a ward in Kirkcaldy as a councillor, and still lives in the town, which is just outside the Central Fife constituency. Her constituency office was based in Glenrothes, adjacent to Fife Council's headquarters.

In 2007, she lost her constituency to SNP politician Tricia Marwick.

References

External links 
 
 Christine May MSP personal site
 Christine May MSP profile at the site of Scottish Labour

1948 births
Living people
Labour Co-operative MSPs
Councillors in Fife
Members of the Scottish Parliament 2003–2007
Politicians from Dublin (city)
Female members of the Scottish Parliament
Scottish Labour councillors
People from Kirkcaldy
Women councillors in Scotland